The Edo Museum of West African Art is a planned museum for west African art to be built in Benin City, Nigeria. It will show over 300 items on loan from European museums. Its architect, David Adjaye, revealed renderings for the museum in November 2020. The Metropolitan Museum of Art will repatriate two Benin Bronzes to be shown in the museum.

References 

African art museums
Museums in Nigeria